The Misses Vickers is an oil painting by John Singer Sargent. The painting depicts three young ladies, from the Vickers family, in their estate in Bolsover Hill, Sheffield, England.

Background
The Misses Vickers, painted in 1884 by John Singer Sargent, is a portrait of three sisters, Florence Evelyn Vickers, Mabel Frances Vickers, and Clara Mildred Vickers. The portrait was commissioned by their father, Colonel Thomas Vickers, a wealthy industrialist. Following its completion, The Misses Vickers was first exhibited at the Salon of 1885 alongside a portrait of Mrs. Albert Vickers, completed by Sargent in June 1884. Sargent later exhibited The Misses Vickers with Mrs. Albert Vickers and Portrait of Mrs. Robert Harrison at the Royal Academy in 1886. Despite Colonel Vickers being pleased with the portrait, art critics at the Salon of 1885 overlooked it. The general opinion was less than enthusiastic, but one anonymous critic from The Spectator felt that the portrait was "in its way probably the cleverest thing in the exhibition. It is the ne plus ultra of French painting, or rather, of the French method as learned by a foreigner."

Inspiration

Sargent was an admirer of the Pre-Raphaelite Brotherhood, an art movement founded by Dante Gabriel Rossetti in 1848. Rossetti's own portraits of women served as aesthetic inspiration to Sargent. It has been noted that grouping of the three sisters in The Misses Vickers is very similar to The Daughters of Edward Darley Boit, a portrait painted by Sargent in 1882. There are also formal similarities to Hearts Are Trumps, a group portrait of the Misses Armstrong painted by Sir John Everett Millais in 1872.

Execution and aftermath
Sargent was commissioned to paint the Vickers sisters just before his 1884 exhibition of Portrait of Madame X, a painting which was met with controversy and negativity from critics and the general public, who felt that the painting was overly sexual. Though Sargent left Paris soon after the negative critiques of his portrait of Madame Gautreau and feared that he would lose the business of those who had already commissioned him for portraits, Colonel Vickers did not withdraw his request. In July, Sargent travelled to the Vickers’ estate in Sheffield to begin the portrait. Following the competition of the portrait of his daughters, Colonel Vickers commissioned portraits of his wife and sons, and eventually Sargent was commissioned to paint the portraits of thirteen members of the extended Vickers family. In addition to being their portraitist, Sargent knew the Vickers family on a personal level, and became a regular guest at family dinners and parties.

Following the wealthy, glamorous, and often-flashy clientele of Paris, Sargent viewed the commission from Colonel Vickers, a businessman and head of a well-respected family, as a regression from what his career had been. He described his subjects as "three ugly women" who "lived in a dingy hole", though the disdain he seems to have felt for his subjects is not readily apparent in the portrait itself. Sargent painted the sisters in fine day dresses with yards of material draping across their laps and spilling out of the sofa and chair they are seated upon. The presence of everyday objects, such as two cups of tea, a small pitcher of milk, and a piano, give the painting a casual tone. Although the scene is quiet, still, and contemplative, Sargent includes one detail of implied movement in the form of a book. The two sisters seated on the couch are flipping through a book, and though Sargent has painted all other elements in this scene with clarity, the pages of the book are blurred. Because of the objects within the scene and the positioning of the sisters, the scene manages to be both still and active at the same time, and the three Vickers sisters appear humble, despite their wealth.

Reception
The Times of May 22, 1886, reviewed the painting as follows:

Notes

References
 The Misses Vickers by John Singer Sargent - Yorkshire's Favourite Paintings
 Fairbrother, Trevor J. John Singer Sargent: The Sensualist. New Haven: Seattle Art Museum, 2000.
 Ratcliff, Carter. John Singer Sargent. New York City: Abbeville Press, 1982. 
 Redford, Bruce. John Singer Sargent and the Art of the Allusion. New Haven: Yale University Press, 2016.

Further reading

1884 paintings
19th-century portraits
Group portraits by American artists
Paintings by John Singer Sargent
Paintings in the collection of Sheffield Museums
Portraits of women
Books in art